is the first, and debut, single released by Mr. Children on August 21, 1992.

Overview
The single reached #69 on the Oricon Japanese charts selling 21,710 copies. The title track was a cut from Mr. Children's debut album, Everything, which was released on May 10, 1992. The b-side track, is included in the group's second album, Kind of Love, released on December 1, 1992.  was also included in Mr. Children's first compilation album Mr. Children 1992–1995, released on July 11, 2001.

Track listing

Personnel 
 Kazutoshi Sakurai – vocals, guitar
 Kenichi Tahara – guitar
 Keisuke Nakagawa – bass
 Hideya Suzuki – drums

Production 
 Producer – Kobayashi Takeshi
 Arrangement - Mr. Children and Takeshi Kobayashi

References 

1992 singles
Mr. Children songs
Songs written by Kazutoshi Sakurai
1992 songs
Toy's Factory singles
Song recordings produced by Takeshi Kobayashi